This article lists the squads for the 2000 Women's Rugby League World Cup.

The lists are derived from the Official Programme, supplemented by contemporary newspaper articles and the New Zealand Rugby League Almanack 2000. The Official Programme included pen portraits that named the occupation, position(s), club and past representative teams of most of the players.

Australia
Australia played four matches in the tournament. Three players from Western Australia were selected and included in the touring party. Heritage numbers were identified in 2021. A contemporary newspaper article listed the playing 17 for Australia's second match (the third of the tournament).

The tally of tries and goals are from the first two matches involving Australia where the Australian scorers are known. The source for Australia's third match (against New Zealand) listed only the New Zealand scorers. Australia did not score in their fourth match (against Great Britain).

A pre-tournament preview article in the Courier Mail named Karyn Murphy as co-captain. The Official Programme did not designate the Australian co-captains but did list the following support staff:
 Coach: Wayne Portlock
 Conditioner: Haydn Masters
 Manager: Jeanette Luker
 Assistant: Sue Taylor
 Strapper: Ray Ward

Great Britain & Ireland
Great Britain & Ireland played four matches in the tournament. Contemporary newspaper articles list the playing 17 for Great Britain & Ireland's second and fourth matches (the third match of the tournament, and the Final).

The Official Programme noted Brenda Dobek and Michelle Land as joint-captains and listed the following support staff:
 Head Coach: Jackie Sheldon
 Technical Coaching Advisor: Ray Unsworth
 Conditioner: Simon Worsnop
 Team Manager: Julie Wells
 Team Manager: Andy MacDonald
 Event Co-ordinator: Roland Davis
 Team Administrator: Julia Lee

New Zealand
New Zealand played four matches in the tournament. Heritage numbers were identified in 2021. A contemporary newspaper article listed the playing 17 for New Zealand's fourth match (the Final).

The Almanac included a short article, the scores from New Zealand's matches, New Zealand's try scorers and goal kickers and a tally of match appearances, tries, goals and points.

The above table reflects player surnames used in the Kiwi Ferns Honour Roll. The Official Programme used the names Selena Te Amo (Edmonds), Nicole Presland-Tack and Lynley Tierney-Mani. The Official Programme listed the following support staff: 
 Coach: Michael Rawiri
 Manager: Gavin Tavendale
 Trainer: Bob Vercoe
 Physiotherapist: Leah Purcell
 Media: Claudette Hauti

References

Rugby League World Cups hosted by New Zealand
Women's World Cup
Women's Rugby League World Cup
2000 in New Zealand rugby league
World Cup